The Liberty L-8 (also known as the Packard 1A-1100) was a prototype of the Liberty L-12 engine designed by Jesse Vincent and Elbert Hall. Fifteen L-8 prototypes were manufactured by several companies including Buick, Ford, Lincoln, Marmon, and Packard in 1917. The first of those built now resides in the National Air and Space Museum in Washington, D.C., while fifteenth L-8 (the only running example) powers Liberty the Second housed by the Conneaut Lake Historical Society in Conneaut Lake, PA. Another L-8 is stored at the National Museum of the U.S. Air Force in Dayton, OH.

Specifications (Liberty L-8)

See also

References

1910s aircraft piston engines
Packard aircraft engines